ProCredit Bank is a commercial bank based in Bucharest, Romania. It was founded in 2002 as Banca de Microfinantare MIRO and was renamed in December 2004.

In 2013, the bank signed loan guarantee agreements with the European Investment Fund in order to give small and medium businesses in Romania better access to loans.

The bank experienced significant growth over the period from 2005 until 2009..

References

External links

Banks of Romania